Johnny W. Bell (born June 15, 1965) is an American politician who served as a Democratic member of the Kentucky House of Representatives representing District 23 from 2007 to 2016. He also served as the Majority Whip of the Kentucky House of Representatives from 2015 to 2016.

Education
Bell earned his BS from Western Kentucky University and his JD from Northern Kentucky University.

Elections
2012 Bell was unopposed for both the May 22, 2012 Democratic Primary and the November 6, 2012 General election, winning with 12,250 votes.
2006 To challenge District 23 incumbent Republican Representative Steve Nunn, Bell was unopposed for the 2006 Democratic Primary and won the November 7, 2006 General election with 6,652 votes (53.4%) against Representative Nunn.
2008 Bell was unopposed for both the 2008 Democratic Primary and the November 4, 2008 General election, winning with 12,418 votes.
2010 Bell was unopposed for the May 18, 2010 Democratic Primary and won the November 2, 2010 General election with 7,741 votes (56.7%) against Republican nominee Pam Browning.

References

External links
Official page at the Kentucky General Assembly

Johnny Bell at Ballotpedia
Johnny W. Bell at the National Institute on Money in State Politics

Place of birth missing (living people)
1965 births
Living people
Kentucky lawyers
Democratic Party members of the Kentucky House of Representatives
People from Glasgow, Kentucky
Salmon P. Chase College of Law alumni
Western Kentucky University alumni
21st-century American politicians